Rajesh Sharma may refer to:

Rajesh Sharma (actor) (born 1971), Indian film actor
Rajesh Sharma (Malayalam actor) (born 1973), Indian film actor

Rajesh Sharma (cricketer) (born 1995), Indian cricketer
Rajesh Kumar Sharma (born 1978), Indian politician